Super Giant Robot Brothers is an animated action-adventure comedy streaming television series created by Víctor Maldonado and Alfredo Torres for Netflix. It was released on August 4, 2022.

Premise
In the future, two giant robot brothers must defend the Earth from an evil intergalactic empire that is sending kaiju to destroy the world.

Cast
 Marisa Davila as Alex Rose
 Eva Airel Binder as Baby Alex
 Chris Diamantopoulos as Thunder
 Delbert Hunt as Creed
 Eric Lopez as Shiny
 Tommy Bello Rivas as Overlord Master and Dr. Arcturo Rose
 Ren Hanami as Magita Rose

Additional voices provided by Jared Ward, Gina Ravera, Anouar Smaine, Muprhy Patrick Martin, David Errigo Jr., Jeanine Meyers, Delbert Hunt and Chris Jai Alex

Episodes
Every episode is directed by former Pixar filmmaker Mark Andrews.

Production
The series was announced in June 2021. The production is notable for its use of virtual production techniques including motion capture and virtual camera for blocking of characters and actions inside Unreal Engine. This motion capture data was used as a reference for animators before final key frame animation was send back to Unreal where the whole show was rendered in real-time, making the series one of the first to be rendered entirely in real-time. While the animation was provided by Reel FX's facilities in Montreal, the Mumbai-based studio Assemblage Entertainment done the additional animation.

Tributes to other media
The series makes tribute to other media.
In Episode 1, Gone and Back Again, Alex Rose shouts "What's the frequency, Kenneth?" to another character, who is never referred to or seen again. This is a tribute to R.E.M.'s song "What's the frequency, Kenneth?" 
In Episode 5, Inner Space, a random character is sneezed on and yells "I'm not even supposed to be here today" which is in tribute to Kevin Smith's film Clerks.

References

External links

2020s American animated television series
2022 American television series debuts
2020s Canadian animated television series
2022 Canadian television series debuts
American children's animated action television series
American children's animated adventure television series
American children's animated comedy television series
American computer-animated television series
Animated television series about brothers
Animated television series about robots
Canadian children's animated action television series
Canadian children's animated adventure television series
Canadian children's animated comedy television series
Canadian computer-animated television series
English-language Netflix original programming
Netflix children's programming
Television series by Netflix Animation